Určice is a municipality and village in Prostějov District in the Olomouc Region of the Czech Republic. It has about 1,400 inhabitants.

Notable people
Václav Kaprál (1889–1947), composer and pianist
František Kopečný (1909–1990), linguist

References

Villages in Prostějov District